Félix-Roland Moumié (1 November 1925 – 3 November 1960) was an anti-colonialist Cameroonian leader, assassinated in Geneva on 3 November 1960  by an agent of the SDECE (French secret service) with thallium, following official independence from France earlier that year. Félix-Roland Moumié succeeded Ruben Um Nyobé, who was killed in September 1958, as leader of the Union des Populations du Cameroun (UPC - or also Union du Peuple Camerounais — "Cameroon's People Union").

Biography

Félix Moumié was born in 1925 at the Protestant hospital of Njissé in Foumban, Samuel Mekou Moumié evangelist at the Protestant mission and Suzanne Mvuh. He began his primary studies at the Bandjo school, continued them at the Protestant school in Njissé, then at the public school in Bafoussam (CMI), and completed them at the regional school in Dschang (CMII) where he brilliantly obtained the primary school certificate.

He was sensitized to anti-colonialist and communist ideas during his studies, notably with Gabriel d'Arboussier (the future Secretary General of the African Democratic Rally) and the historian Jean Suret-Canale

In April 1958, he attended the "Conference of Independent African States" organized by the Ghanaian President Kwame Nkrumah. He befriended Frantz Fanon, who represented the Algerian FLN. Accompanied by Osendé Afana, he went to Congo in 1960 to meet with President Patrice Lumumba, who had shown sympathy for the upecist cause, but who was then overthrown by Colonel Mobutu's troops, who drove them out of the country.

Knowing that he was constantly under surveillance by the French intelligence services, he ensured that he never flew over French territory and avoided the airspace of the countries that were members of the French Community. He feared that his plane would be intercepted, as the plane of Ahmed Ben Bella and FLN leaders was in 1956. He lived mainly between Ghana and Guinea where he sought to gain support for the UPC.

See also 

Colonialism
List of assassinated anti-colonialist leaders from article Decolonization
Cameroon's People Union (UPC)
Jacques Foccart
Marthe Ekemeyong Moumié

References

External links 
 "Cameroun: Il faut tuer l’UPC et Félix Moumié", from Marianne magazine, March 30, 2005
 "France's Dirty War in Cameroon: The Assassination of Félix-Roland Moumié" from Scribbles from the Den

1960 deaths
Cameroonian rebels
Contemporary French history
Assassinated Cameroonian politicians
Cameroonian people murdered abroad
People murdered in Switzerland
Union of the Peoples of Cameroon politicians
People of French Equatorial Africa
1926 births
1960 murders in Switzerland
People killed in French intelligence operations